St Joseph's Hall in Greyfriars Lane, Storrington, West Sussex is a Grade II listed  former residence of the Bishop of Arundel and Brighton. It was built as a private house for US businessman George Trotter in 1910, and then sold to a French religious order, the Norbertines. In 1956 it was used by Vincent and Nona Byrne as a home for refugees from the Hungarian uprising.

References

Grade II listed buildings in West Sussex
Horsham District
Vernacular architecture
Revivalism (architecture)